Palijo / Palejo / Paleejo / Palija / Paleja / Paleeja (Sindhi: پليجو) is a Sammat tribe of Sindh province, Pakistan. During the Talpur dynasty and before, this tribe held lands on the banks of the Indus River when that area was under official administration of the Palijo tribe and was called Palijar'pargana, ranging from Choriya Jagir, now in Tando Muhammad Khan District, to Pinyari Phat, in Sujawal District.

Distribution
Most of this tribe live mainly in the Bannu, and Daro areas of Sujawal District, Jungshahi, Gujjo, Gharo and Mirpur Sakro areas of Thatta District, Nasarpur in Matiari District, Dadoon and Norai in Tando Muhammad Khan District. However some families are settled Sunn in Jamshoro District,  Bangaldero in Larkana District,  Hingorja in Khairpur District,  and in the cities of Hyderabad and Karachi The total population of Palijo tribe is around 15,000.

The head (Sardar) of this tribe is called Arbab and current head of Palijo tribe is Arbab Abdul Hai Palijo, son of the late Arbab Noor Muhammad Palijo.

Notable people with this surname  
Rasul Bux Palejo Senior politician, scholar, advocate, and writer.
Ayaz Latif Palijo President Qaumi Awami Tahreek (QAT), Leader of main opposition alliance in Sindh Grand Democratic Alliance (GDA), Human Rights Lawyer and writer.
Sassui Palijo is an elected senator on women's reserved seat in the Senate of Pakistan. She was twice elected member of the Provincial Assembly of Sindh from Mirpur Sakro, Thatta.

References

Sindhi tribes
Sindhi names
Sindhi-language surnames